Abdi Bashiir Indhobuur was a Somali post  and songwriter. He wrote a song called Arligeygow, translated to mean My Land.

Indhobuur was born in Gaalkacyo in the Mudug region of Somalia.

Career 
In 1963, he joined the police force, permanently moving to the capital, Mogadishu, in 1972. Shortly afterwards, he joined Heegan, a troupe associated with the Somali National Theatre.

References

Somalian dramatists and playwrights
Somalian musicians
Somali-language writers
Year of birth missing